Bilebal is a village in Dharwad district of Karnataka, India.

Demographics 
As of the 2011 Census of India there were 275 households in Bilebal and a total population of 1,333 consisting of 694 males and 639 females. There were 162 children ages 0-6.

References

Villages in Dharwad district